is a Japanese politician. Born in Tokyo, she holds a BA in international relations from the University of Tokyo, and an MPhil in economics from Yale University, where she became a member of President's Council on International Activities. Currently, she is a professor at the Meiji Institute for Global Affairs in Tokyo.

Kawaguchi is a former Minister of the Environment of Japan from 2000 to 2002. Subsequently, she served Minister for Foreign Affairs from 2002 to 2004 and continued as a special adviser to the Japanese prime minister for foreign affairs from 2004 to 2005. She was also a former Member of the House of Councillors for the Liberal Democratic Party from 2005 to 2013. In July 2008, she was appointed cochair of a new International Commission on Nuclear Non-proliferation and Disarmament, with former Australian Minister for Foreign Affairs, Gareth Evans.

Career 

A former economist at the World Bank, Kawaguchi served as Minister at the Embassy of Japan to the United States in 1990. She worked as a Director General of Global Environmental Affairs at the Ministry of International Trade and Industry (now Ministry of Economy, Trade and Industry) between 1992 and 1993 before becoming a Managing Director of Suntory Holdings Ltd. in September 1993. In 2000, Kawaguchi was the director-general of the Environment Agency.

She was elected to the House of Councillors in 2005, serving two terms through 2013. During her years as a Diet member, she served as deputy chair of the General Assembly of Liberal Democratic Party members in the Upper House. She also became the director and chair of the Environment Committee, director of the Budget Committee and director of the Commission on the Constitution. Kawaguchi served as chair of the LDP Okinawa Promotion Committee as well as co-chair of the International Commission on Nuclear Non-Proliferation and Disarmament and a board member of the World Economic Forum’s Young Global Leaders Foundation in 2008. Currently, she is a member of the Tokyo Foundation CSR Committee.

Controversies 

Kawaguchi, then a senior lawmaker of the ruling coalition Liberal Democratic Party, was ousted from her post as head of the Environment Committee of the House of Councillors when Japan's Upper House passed a resolution to fire her back in May 2013. This was due to her unauthorized extension of stay in China which made the panel she led cancel a scheduled session.

Kawaguchi earned the approval of the parliament to go to China from April 23 to 24 to attend a conference but without prior permission, she extended for one more day to meet foreign policy official State Councilor Yang Jiechi. Kawaguchi apologizes to Prime Minister Shinzō Abe, who is also the head of the LDP, of her unannounced leave but reasons that the last-minute arrangements with Yang was for Japan's best interests. This extension gained a lot of criticisms from the opposition parties as Kawaguchi violated parliamentary rules as well neglected her duties. However those who are in defense of the lawmaker such as Chief Cabinet Secretary Yoshihide Suga and LDP Secretary General Shigeru Ishiba say that the meeting between the two ministers was in order to address the territorial dispute going on between Japan and China in the East China Sea.

The meeting was considered a rare chance given the escalated tensions going on between the two countries and that this might not be possible again anytime in the near future.  This commotion by the opposition was then seen as a futile attempt to weaken the power of LDP seeing as they control the Lower House and they might take hold of the Upper House with the upcoming elections. However, on May 9, 2013, the resolution of ousting Kawaguchi was passed despite the attempts of administration officials to defend her intentions.  The cancelled session scheduled on April 25 was the basis of the resolution and dismissal. Furthermore, her actions were perceived as disrespect of the power of the Upper House and her duties. The resolution was backed up by 7 opposition parties who then had the control of the Upper House.

Honors and awards 

In December 2003, Kawaguchi received the “Aguila Azteca Medal” from Vicente Fox, President of the United Mexican States. She is a recipient of an Anniversary Medal from the mayor of Sankt-Peterburg during the 300th anniversary of the city. March 2004, the Republic of Paraguay awarded Kawaguchi with the “Gran Cruz Extraordinaria” (National Testimonial Medal). She also received a Certificate of Doctor Honoris Causa by the authority of the Academic Council of the National University of Mongolia in September 2004. In October 2008, Kawaguchi received a Wilbur Cross Medal from Yale University for distinguished public service. She was also awarded “Star of Jerusalem” in October 2010 by Mahmoud Abbas, President of the Palestinian National Authority. October the following year, she received once again an Anniversary Medal for a major contribution to global security promotion and non-proliferation regime by K. Kadyrzhanov, Director General of the National Nuclear Center.

References

External links 
  Official website

|-

|-
 

1941 births
Living people
People from Tokyo
University of Tokyo alumni
Yale University alumni
Female members of the House of Councillors (Japan)
Women government ministers of Japan
Female foreign ministers
Members of the House of Councillors (Japan)
Environment ministers of Japan
Foreign ministers of Japan
Toyota Tsusho
Japanese women diplomats
Japanese diplomats